Anti-Slavic sentiment, also known as Slavophobia, a form of racism or xenophobia, refers to various negative attitudes towards Slavic peoples, the most common manifestation is the claim that the inhabitants of Slavic nations are inferior to other ethnic groups. Anti-Slavism reached its peak during World War II, when Nazi Germany declared Slavs, especially neighboring Poles to be subhuman (Untermensch) and planned to exterminate the majority of Slavic people.

20th century

Albania 
At the beginning of the 20th century, anti-Slavism developed in Albania by the work of the Franciscan friars who had studied in monasteries in Austria-Hungary, after the recent massacres and expulsions of Albanians by their Slavic neighbours. The Albanian intelligentsia proudly asserted, "We Albanians are the original and autochthonous race of the Balkans. The Slavs are conquerors and immigrants who came but yesterday from Asia". In Soviet historiography, anti-Slavism in Albania was inspired by the Catholic clergy, which opposed the Slavic people because of the role the Catholic clergy " and Slavs opposed "rapacious plans of Austro-Hungarian imperialism in Albania".

Fascism and Nazism 
Anti-Slavism was a notable component of Italian Fascism and Nazism both prior to and during World War II.

In the 1920s, Italian fascists hated the Yugoslavs, especially the Serbs. They accused the Serbs of having "atavistic impulses" and they also claimed that the Yugoslavs were conspiring on behalf of "Grand Orient Masonry and its funds". One anti-Semitic claim stated that the Serbs were involved in a "social-democratic, masonic Jewish internationalist plot".

Benito Mussolini considered the Slavic race inferior and barbaric. He believed that the Yugoslavs (Croats) were a threat to Italy because they wanted to seize Dalmatia, a region which was claimed by Italy, and he also claimed that the threat rallied Italians at the end of World War I: "The danger of seeing the Jugo-Slavians settle along the whole Adriatic shore had caused a bringing together in Rome of the cream of our unhappy regions. Students, professors, workmen, citizens—representative men—were entreating the ministers and the professional politicians". These claims often tended to emphasize the "foreignness" of the Yugoslavs by stating that they were newcomers to the area, unlike the ancient Italians, whose territories were occupied by the Slavs.

Count Galeazzo Ciano, Mussolini's son in law, and the Foreign Minister of Fascist Italy who was later executed by Mussolini, wrote the following entry in his diary:

Canada
In Canada, many xenophobic white supremacists were deeply tied to their nation's "Anglo-Saxon" culture, specifically from the early 1900s to the end of World War II. The Ku Klux Klan in Canada was prominent in the provinces of Saskatchewan and Alberta, both of which have a relatively high Eastern European ethnic population. Immigrants from Ukraine, Russia and Poland were frequently denounced and targeted.

During World War I, thousands of Ukrainian Canadians were seen as "enemy aliens" as Canadian nativists saw them as a "threat" to Canada's Western European heritage. Due to this, many of them were interned in concentration camps. There was constant discrimination towards Ukrainians who recently immigrated from the Austro-Hungarian Empire.

Nazi Germany
Anti-Slavic racism is an essential component of Nazism. Adolf Hitler and the Nazi Party regarded Poland and the Soviet Union and their peoples as non-Aryan Untermenschen (subhumans), they were deemed foreign nations that could not be considered part of the Aryan master race. 

Hitler’s autobiography Mein Kampf was openly anti-Slavic. He wrote: “One ought to cast the utmost doubt on the state-building power of the Slavs” and from the beginning, he rejected the idea of incorporating the Slavs into Greater Germany. There were exceptions for some minorities in these states which were deemed by the Nazis to be the descendants of ethnic Germanic settlers, and not merely Slavs who were willing to be Germanized. Hitler considered the Slavs to be racially inferior, because, in his view, the Bolshevik Revolution had put the Jews in power over the mass of Slavs, who were, by his own definition, incapable of ruling themselves but were instead being ruled by Jewish masters. He considered the development of Modern Russia to have been the work of Germanic, not Slavic, elements in the nation, but believed those achievements had been undone and destroyed by the October Revolution, in Mein Kampf, he wrote, “The organization of a Russian state formation was not the result of the political abilities of the Slavs in Russia, but only a wonderful example of the state-forming efficacity of the German element in an inferior race”.

Because, according to the Nazis, the German people needed more territory to sustain its surplus population, an ideology of conquest and depopulation was formulated for Central and Eastern Europe according to the principle of Lebensraum, itself based on an older theme in German nationalism which maintained that Germany had a "natural yearning" to expand its borders eastward (Drang Nach Osten). The Nazis' policy towards Slavs was to exterminate or enslave the vast majority of the Slavic population and repopulate their lands with millions of ethnic Germans and other Germanic peoples. According to the resulting genocidal Generalplan Ost, millions of German and other "Germanic" settlers would be moved into the conquered territories, and the original Slavic inhabitants were to be annihilated, removed or enslaved. The policy was focused especially on the Soviet Union, as it alone was deemed capable of providing enough territory to accomplish this goal. As part of this policy, the Hunger Plan was developed, and it included the seizure of all of the food which was produced on occupied Soviet territory and the delivery of it to Germany, primarily to the German army. The full implementation of this plan would have ultimately resulted in the starvation and death of 20 to 30 million people (mainly Russians, Belarusians, and Ukrainians). It is estimated that in accordance with this plan, over four million Soviet citizens were starved to death from 1941–1944. The resettlement policy reached a much more advanced stage in Occupied Poland because of its immediate proximity to Germany.

For strategic reasons, the Nazis deviated from some of their ideological theories by forging alliances with Ukrainian collaborators, the Independent State of Croatia (established after the invasion of Yugoslavia), and Bulgaria. Yugoslav general Milan Nedić would also lead Nazi Germany's Serbian puppet state. The Nazis officially justified these alliances by stating that the Croats were "more Germanic than Slav", a notion which was propagated by Croatia's fascist dictator Ante Pavelić, who espoused the view that the "Croatians were the descendants of the ancient Goths" who "had the Panslav idea forced upon them as something artificial". However, the Nazi regime continued to classify the Croats as "subhumans" despite its alliance with them. Hitler also believed that the Bulgarians were "Turkoman", while the Czechs were Mongolians in their origins. After conquering Yugoslavia, attention was instead focused on targeting mainly the nation's Jewish and Roma (Gypsy) population.

Greece 
Traditionally, in Greece, Slavic people were considered "invaders who separated the glory of Greek Antiquity, by bringing an era of decline and ruin to Greece – the Dark Ages". In 1913, when Greece took control of Slavic-inhabited areas in Northern Greece, the Slavic toponyms were changed to Greek, and according to the Greek government, this was "the elimination of all the names which pollute and disfigure the beautiful appearance of our fatherland."

Anti-Slavic sentiment escalated during the Greek Civil War, when Macedonian partisans, who aligned themselves with the Democratic Army of Greece, were not treated as equals and suffered discrimination everywhere, they were accused of committing a "sin" because they chose to identify themselves as Slavs rather than Greeks. The Macedonian partisans were subjected to threats of extermination, physical attacks, murder, attacks on their settlements, forcible expulsions, restrictions on freedom of movement, and bureaucratic problems, among other discriminatory acts. Although they were allied with the Greek Left, due to their Slavic identity, the Macedonians were viewed with suspicion and animosity by the Greek Left.

In 1948, the Democratic Army of Greece evacuated tens of thousands of child refugees, both Greek and Slavic in origin. In 1985, the refugees were allowed to re-enter Greece, claim Greek citizenship, and reclaim property, but only if they were "Greek by genus", thus prohibiting those with a Slavic identity from obtaining Greek citizenship, entering Greece, and claiming property.

Today, the Greek state does not recognize its ethnic Macedonian and other Slavic minorities, claiming that they do not exist, with Greece therefore having the right not to grant them any of the rights that are guaranteed to them by human-rights treaties.

Romania 

Romanians, largely surrounded by Slavs, have sometimes manifested anti-Slavic sentiments. Tsarist Russian occupations (1739, 1769, 1806, 1828, 1853), perceived Russian, Soviet and Transnistrian occupations of Bessarabia (1812, 1878, 1940, 1990), squabbling over Dobruja with Bulgaria in the 19th and 20th centuries, and disputes with Ukraine over Snake Island provide instances. Romania became caught up in German slavophobia during World War II, invading the Soviet Union alongside other Axis forces in 1941 and occupying much of south-western Ukraine (1941-1944) as part of "Greater Romania". The regime of Ceaușescu in Romania (1965-1989) exhibited some anti-Soviet attitudes.

See also 

 Anti-Catholicism
 Anti-Croat sentiment
 Anti-Polish sentiment
 Anti-Russian sentiment
 Anti-Serbian sentiment
 Anti-Ukrainian sentiment
 Final Solution of the Czech Question
 Pan-Slavism
 Persecution of Eastern Orthodox Christians
 Refugees of the Greek Civil War
 Slavic speakers of Greek Macedonia
 Zamość Uprising

References 
Notes

Further reading

 
 
Bystrov, V. U., and A. E. Kotov. "'Demos In Its Absolute Beauty': Conservative Criticism of Slavs and Liberal Pan-Slavism in the 1860s-1880s." Studia Culturae 35 (2019): 9+ online.
 
 
 Đorđević, Vladimir, et al. "Beyond Contemporary Scholarship and toward Exploring Current Manifestations of Pan-Slavism."  Canadian-American Slavic Studies 55.2 (2021): 147-159.
 
 
 
 
 
 Konstantinova, Yura. "The Slavic and Anti-Slavic Idea in the Context of the East-West Dilemma. Slovenians, Bulgarians, and Greeks in Late 19th and Early 20th Centuries." Études balkaniques 3 (2015): 126-149.
 
 
 Phillips, Megan. "Don’t Believe Everything You See at the Movies: The Influence of Anti-Communist and Anti-Slavic Governmental Propaganda in Hollywood Cinema in the Decade Following WWII." The Alexandrian 4.1 (2015). online
 
 
 Rossino, Alexander B. Hitler strikes Poland: Blitzkrieg, ideology, and atrocity (University Press of Kansas, 2003) online review.
 
 Sulyak, S. G. "The Slavic Factor in the History of Moldova: Scientific Research and Myth-Making." RUSIN 49.3 (2017): 144-162. online